The COSAFA Women's U17 Championship is an annual football tournament for women's under-17 teams from Southern Africa organized by the Council of Southern Africa Football Associations (COSAFA). The tournament was introduced to develop the woman's game and strengthen the region's nation's competitiveness in the continental qualifiers.  Invited from CECAFA, Uganda become the first champions after beating South Africa in the inaugural 2019 final in Mauritius. Even the second edition was won by a CECAFA representant, this time Tanzania won over Zambia in the final.

Results

g: Invited guest team, no COSAFA member.

Awards

References

External links
Official website

COSAFA Under-17 Championship
COSAFA competitions
Women's association football competitions in Africa